Olav Lundanes (born 11 November 1987) is a Norwegian orienteering competitor, hailing from Ålesund. He has won gold medal at the World Orienteering Championships ten times and the European Orienteering Championships four times. He competes for Halden SK.

Career

Junior

Lundanes competed at the 2005 Junior World Orienteering Championships in Tenero, where he won a gold medal in the long distance, a gold medal in the relay event, and placed fourth in the middle distance. He received a silver and two bronze medals in the 2006 Junior World Championships. In 2007 he had great success in the Junior World Championships, with victories in the long distance and the middle distance, and silver medals in both the sprint and the relay.

He has 11 victories in the national junior championships.

Senior
Lundanes debuted in World Championships  at the 2007 World Orienteering Championships in Kyiv. At the 2008 European Orienteering Championships in Ventspils he finished 19th in the long distance.

He placed fourth in the sprint and 7th in the long distance at the 2009 World Orienteering Championships in Miskolc.

Lundanes won the long distance event in the World Orienteering Championships in 2010 in Trondheim. Later same week he won silver in the relay event together with Audun Weltzien and Carl Waaler Kaas.

In 2012 he won gold medal at the long distance in the World Championships in Lausanne, Switzerland. He ran the last leg on the Norwegian team who achieved their third consecutive silver medal in the relay.

In Asiago in 2014, Lundanes won his first World Championship gold in middle distance. Thierry Gueorgiou was first announced as the winner, but was later disqualified for undeliberatily skipping a control. At the same championships, Lundanes won a bronze medal at the long distance. He became third even in the following World Championship long distance event in Inverness, Great Britain.

At the 2016 World Orienteering Championships in Strömstad and Tanum he won a gold medal in the long distance. He won a silver medal in the middle distance, and was part of the Norwegian team which won the relay.

Lundanes has, as of the end of the 2018 season, not won the overall Orienteering World Cup. He finished second in 2012 and 2017 and third in 2015, 2016 and 2018.

He has 23 victories in the national championships (long 2009/2010/2011/2015/2016/2017/2018, middle 2010/2013/2017, night 2010/2012/2016, ultralong 2010/2012/2015/2016/2018, sprint 2012, relay 2009/2010/2016/2017)

Results

World Championship results

World Cup victories

References

External links

1987 births
Living people
Norwegian orienteers
Male orienteers
Foot orienteers
Sportspeople from Ålesund
World Orienteering Championships medalists
20th-century Norwegian people
21st-century Norwegian people
Junior World Orienteering Championships medalists